100% Senorita is 2003 a Taiwanese romance comedy drama television series starring Joe Chen, Wallace Huo as the main lead, with Deric Wan, Penny Lin and Jason Hsu in supporting roles. The drama began broadcasting on CTS channel on September 13, 2003 and finished on January 6, 2004 with 40 episodes total. The drama was re-broadcast every following Saturday on Sanlih's SETTV with a 90-minute version of the drama.

Synopsis
When a surrogate mother gives birth to twins, she keeps Liang Xiao Feng (Chen Qiao En) by her side, and gives Zhuang Fei Yang (Penny Lin) away, who ends up in a wealthy family. Years later, Zhuang Fei Yang becomes the heiress of Formosa Inc, a company created by her father and Peter works as General Manager. However, when Fei Yang's father passes away, Peter tries to kill Fei Yang and take the company for his own. Despite Peter's attempts, Fei Yang miraculously survive from the accident and saved by a cosmetic surgeon who mistakenly thought she is his daughter. The surgeon does the cosmetic surgery on Fei Yang to reconstruct her face that being damaged by the accident. From then on, the twins’ fates entwine once more.

Summary
Born through a surrogate mother, Zhuang Fei Yang is the sole millionaire heiress of Formosa Inc, a company owned by her father and directed by CEO Peter, Fei Yang's high-profile boyfriend. Soon after her father's sudden death, the heiress’ life is shaken by a murder attempt by the scheming Peter. Fei Yang survives the car accident without Peter's knowledge, but her face becomes unrecognizable after a dramatic plastic surgery to cover her deformed features. All due to the plastic surgeon mistaking Fei yang to be his long lost daughter who has come back to him, and he surgeons his daughter's face on Fei yang, changing her identity. Wanting to be restored to her identity and to save Formosa from Peter's hands, Fei Yang employs the help of Xiao Feng, her long-lost twin sister. The uncultured Xiao Feng swaps identities with the rich Fei Yang in a desperate attempt to regain Formosa, and the plot thickens as Peter, Fei Yang's admirers Wei Xiang and Je Lin, her best friend Sha Sha, her governess, and the sisters themselves discover the mystery of their identities step by step.

Cast

Main cast 
Joe Chen as Liang Xiao Feng/Zhuang Fei Yang
20 years old, speaks what is on her mind, relaxed and straightforward attitude. Those that come close to her would be influenced by her youthfulness and vitality. Although her appearance seems to be rough and tough and sometimes, even have blank expressions but she would do anything for her family. Her spirit of sacrificing for the family would make people feel touched. She would always show her lively and bright side to people and keep her sorrows and tears silently to herself.
Penny Lin as Zhuang Fei Yang/Liang Xiao Feng
20 years old, rich family's daughter, high education level, beautiful and excellent temperament. Because her father had an accident, he left behind a tremendous business for her to be in charge of. However, owing to the fact that she fell for her lover's poisonous trap, her face was damaged. With nowhere to go, she gets mixed together with a group of youngsters "Snatching Money Clan." Never thought that it was here that she found herself, found freedom, and also true love.
Wallace Huo as Li Wei Xiang
25 years old, head of Zhu Luo Ji.com Enterprise, very handsome, un-matchable personality. Always acting ruthless and cold but actually, it is so that he can conceal the scar that is within him, He was originally a gifted student in the law department. He was recruited at a young age and became a celebrity lawyer. However, when his father, who was a judge, tells Wei Xiang that years ago, because of a wrong sentence, it snatched away an innocent life, broke up a family, he adopted a young child that was left behind --- which turns out to be him. Wei Xiang was not able to accept this shock and for this reason, he left the Judge, gave up everything and started a life of banishing himself.
Deric Wan as Pan Bi De "Peter"
27 years old, general manager of "Fu Er Mo Sha" Enterprise, young with a bright future, handsome and easy-going, regards himself as very high/tall. His romance and numerous feelings is enough to confuse everybody. His steady management is enough to gain people's trust and have the power and authority within his hands. Yet he has a young wound that no one knows about which causes the deepest part of his heart to possess a side of dim evilness. In order to reach his goal, he would get to it by any means that he can with ruthlessness and without a care for anyone at all.
Jason Hsu as Meng Zhe Lin
 22 years old, is Bi De's special assistant, has always had a secret crush on Fei Yang. Yet, never mind about telling her his feelings, ordinarily, there isn't even a chance for him to get close to her. To him, Fei Yang is a distant dream. Yet, when Xiao Feng appears as a substitute of Fei Yang, the situation changes around completely. His love sickness finally comes true and becomes Fei Yang's (who is actually Xiao Feng) protector by her side.

Supporting cast 
Jason Tang as Ma Ji
Ke Yi Rou as Ba Bi
Liu Guang Yuan as Pa Zi
Joyce Chao as Feng Xiao Chen
Chiang Tsu-ping as Chen Sha Sha
Liao Jun as Hong Bo
Ke Shu Qin as Yang Zhu Fang
Michael Huang as President Chou

Remake
It remade by Indonesia as Putri Kembar starring by Stefanie Hariadi Theresia as Chika (Liang Xiao Feng), Richa Novisha as Sasha (Zhuang Fei Yang), and Roger Danuarta.

References

Sanlih E-Television original programming
2004 Taiwanese television series debuts
2004 Taiwanese television series endings